Sima Jun may refer to:

 Sima Jun (司馬鈞), great-grandfather of Sima Fang, Han dynasty military general
 Sima Jun (司馬儁), father of Sima Fang, Han dynasty official who served as the Administrator of Yingchuan
 Sima Jun (prince) (司馬駿; 232–286), Jin dynasty prince